Booty Call is a 1997 American buddy comedy film, written by J. Stanford Parker (credited as Bootsie) and Takashi Bufford, and directed by Jeff Pollack. The film stars Jamie Foxx, Tommy Davidson, Vivica A. Fox, and Tamala Jones.

Plot
Rushon Askins, a tender-hearted, upwardly-mobile man, has been dating his self-righteous-to-a-fault girlfriend Nikki for seven weeks. They really like each other, but their relationship has not yet been consummated; Nikki is unsure if their relationship is ready for the next stage.

Rushon asks Nikki out to dinner, but Nikki wants it to be a double date. She brings her opinionated friend and neighbor Lysterine "Lysti", and Rushon comes with his "bad boy" buddy Bunz. Lysti and Bunz soon end up bonding as both are sexually adventurous and completely uninhibited, despite some initial bickering and resentment towards one another as each of them overplayed their roles by trying to come off as a player (Bunz) or overly high-maintenance (Lysti). Meanwhile, the more conservative and prudish Nikki decides it is time for her and Rushon to take their relationship to the next level, much to Rushon's surprise and excitement. However, they have one small problem: this is the 1990s, and Nikki wants to practice "safe sex." Rushon produces a condom and just as he removes the wrapper, Nikki's mischievous, poorly trained, small terrier dog named "Killer" snatches and destroys Rushon's only condom, forcing him to have to go out and buy more condoms. Nikki then calls lusty Lysterine and brainwashes her into her frame of moral logic and urges her to make Bunz (also condomless) use condom as well. Therefore, Rushon (who has to take Killer along for his walk) and Bunz go on wild, late night adventures from store to store trying to find "protection" before everyone's mood evaporates. The two friends run across a wild assortment of characters which includes wacky Punjabi convenience store owners, a would-be armed robber, a hypocritical judge (Bernie Mac) and his female clerk/secret lover, and last but not least, a disobedient Killer who escapes his leash while Rushon and Bunz are in a store and leads them on a blocks-long chase.

Things soon lead to all four friends being at the hospital when Bunz accidentally shoots Rushon in the leg with a gun he took from a paranoid cabbie moments earlier. The group initially encounters a rude, unsympathetic admissions nurse who denies Rushon entry into the hospital because he has no insurance until Bunz runs across a doctor's credentials and impersonates the doctor to get his buddy admitted into the facility. However, "Doctor" Bunz is soon called in to help deliver a baby, which takes priority over a flesh wound, and he loses track of Rushon who is mistaken for a patient who is scheduled to be castrated (that patient shrewdly switched charts with Rushon upon finding out about his operation). The real doctor whom Bunz is impersonating eventually surfaces which leads the admissions nurse and security to search the hospital for the group. Bunz, Lysterine, and Nikki frantically search for Rushon who is soon anesthetized and prepared for castration. Nikki finds him right before the surgery begins and abruptly stops it by yelling that Rushon has no insurance. As both couples leave the hospital, everyone make up as both women take their men home for some long-delayed, kinky but "safe" sex.

Cast
 Jamie Foxx – Bunz
 Tommy Davidson – Rushon Askins
 Vivica A. Fox – Lysterine
 Tamala Jones – Nikki
 Amy Monique Waddell – Arguing Woman
 Art Malik – Akmed
 Bernie Mac – Judge Peabody
 David Hemblen – Dr. Blade
 Amanda Tapping – Dr. Moore
 Gedde Watanabe – Chan
 Karen Robinson – Admitting Nurse
 Ric Young – Mr. Chiu
 Scott LaRose – Singh

Production
The original script was heavily rewritten by director Jeff Pollack and Tommy Davidson. Prior to the film's release, it was noted that there were similarities with its condom plot to another film in development, Trojan War, which featured an all-white cast and which would also be released in 1997. Takashi Bufford said Booty Call was written entirely without knowledge of Trojan War'''s existence and said "Sometimes these things just bubble up from the zeitgeist."

Soundtrack

Reception
On Rotten Tomatoes it has a 31% rating based on reviews from 13 critics. 
Siskel and Ebert gave the film two thumbs up. They praised the vulgar humor, comparing it to Beavis and Butt-head. Ebert in particular said the scenes involving Nikki's pet Jack Russell Terrier were "very, very funny." In their review, The New York Times stated "This contemporary sex farce, directed by Jeff Pollack, has the attention span of a hyperactive child."

In a 1997 interview with Charlie Rose, black actor and filmmaker Charles S. Dutton criticized young African-Americans who went to see Booty Call rather than the historical drama Rosewood'', which was released around the same time.

References

External links
 
 
 Booty Call (soundtrack) at Discogs

1997 films
1997 romantic comedy films
1990s sex comedy films
African-American comedy films
African-American films
American romantic comedy films
American sex comedy films
Columbia Pictures films
1990s English-language films
Films shot in Toronto
Films scored by Robert Folk
Films directed by Jeff Pollack
1990s American films